A General History of the Robberies and Murders of the most notorious Pyrates is a 1724 book published in Britain containing biographies of contemporary pirates, which was influential in shaping popular conceptions of pirates. Its author uses the name Captain Charles Johnson, generally considered a pen name for one of London's writer-publishers. The prime source for the biographies of many well-known pirates, the book gives an almost mythical status to the more colourful characters, and it is likely that the author used considerable licence in his accounts of pirate conversations. The book also contains the name of the pirate flag the Jolly Roger and shows the skull and bones design.

First appearing in Charles Rivington's shop in London, the book sold so well that by 1726 an enlarged fourth edition had appeared. It pandered to the British public's taste for the exotic; revelling in graphic stories on the high seas. English naval historian David Cordingly writes: "It has been said, and there seems no reason to question this, that Captain Johnson created the modern conception of pirates." Scottish novelists Robert Louis Stevenson (author of Treasure Island) and J. M. Barrie (author of Peter Pan featuring Captain Hook) both identified Johnson's General History of the Pyrates as one of their major influences, and Stevenson even borrowed one character's name (Israel Hands) from a list of Blackbeard's crew which appeared in Johnson's book.

Authorship

The author, who uses the name Captain Charles Johnson, has remained unknown in spite of numerous attempts by historians to discover his identity.

In 1932, a literary scholar and writer named John Robert Moore posited that Daniel Defoe be acknowledged the author of A General History. Other sources, including a 2004 paper, suggest that the author could have been publisher Nathaniel Mist (or somebody working for him). Author Colin Woodard, in The Republic of Pirates, considers attribution of Johnson's work to Defoe to be erroneous, and prefers the hypothesis that Johnson was indeed Mist.

Contents

A General History introduced many features which later became common in pirate literature, such as pirates with missing legs or eyes, the notion of pirates burying treasure, and the name of the pirate flag the Jolly Roger. The author specifically cites two pirates as having named their flag Jolly Roger (named after the first Pirate and his crew): Welsh pirate Bartholomew Roberts in June 1721, and English pirate Francis Spriggs in December 1723. The book gives an almost mythical status to the more colourful characters, such as the infamous English pirates Blackbeard and Calico Jack. It provides the standard account of the lives of many people still famous in the 21st century, and has influenced pirate literature of Scottish novelists Robert Louis Stevenson and J. M. Barrie.

The book was released in two volumes. The first mostly deals with early 18th-century pirates, while Volume II records the exploits of their predecessors a few decades earlier. In the first volume, the author sticks fairly close to the available sources, though he embellishes the stories somewhat. He stretches the truth farther in the second volume and includes the biographies of three subjects who may be entirely fictional. The book has been hugely influential in shaping popular notions of piracy.

The pirates profiled in Volume I are:

 Anne Bonny
 Bartholomew ("Black Bart") Roberts
 Blackbeard
 Calico Jack Rackham
 Charles Vane
 Edward England
 Edward Lowe
 Francis Spriggs
 George Lowther
 Henry Every
 Howell Davis
 Israel Hands
 James Martel
 John Evans
 John Gow
 Jolly Roger
 Mary Read
 Richard Worley
 Philip Roche
 Stede Bonnet
 Thomas Anstis

Volume II features:

 Christopher Condent
 John Bowen
 John Halsey
 Nathaniel North
 Samuel Bellamy
 Samuel Burgess
 Thomas Howard
 Thomas Tew
 William Fly
 William Kidd
 David Williams

as well as biographies of the probably fictional captains James Misson, William Lewis, and John Cornelius.

Notes

References
 David Cordingly, Under the Black Flag: The Romance and Reality of Life Among the Pirates. New York: Harcourt Brace, 1995.
 Charles Johnson (1724), A General History of the Robberies and Murders of the Most Notorious Pyrates, a copy on the website of East Carolina University Digital Collections

External links

Volume I

 
 
 Transcription:

Volume II
 Volume II (4th edition)
 Transcription: 

1724 books
Biographies (books)
Pirate books
Works published under a pseudonym